Smokeless tobacco is a tobacco product that is used by means other than smoking. Their use involves chewing, sniffing, or placing the product between gum and the cheek or lip. Smokeless tobacco products are produced in various forms, such as chewing tobacco, snuff, snus, and dissolvable tobacco products. Smokeless tobacco products typically contain over 3000 constituents. All smokeless tobacco products contain nicotine and are therefore highly addictive. Quitting smokeless tobacco use is as challenging as smoking cessation.

Smokeless tobacco is much lower on the risk continuum than combusted products but varies in risk within that class of products (e.g., low nitrosamine Swedish-type snus versus other smokeless tobacco with high nitrosamine levels). It is estimated the safety risk of smokeless tobacco is similar to that of electronic cigarettes. There is no safe level of smokeless tobacco use. It is correlated with a number of adverse effects such as dental disease, oral cancer, oesophagus cancer, and pancreas cancer, as well as adverse reproductive effects including stillbirth, premature birth and low birth weight. Smokeless tobacco products contain cancer-causing chemicals. Approximately 28 chemical constituents present in smokeless tobacco are carcinogenic in nature, among which nitrosamine is the most prominent. Smokeless tobacco accounts for an abundance of deaths globally with a significant proportion of them attributed to Southeast Asia.

Smokeless tobacco consumption is widespread throughout the world. Once addicted to nicotine from smokeless tobacco use, many people, particularly young people, expand their tobacco use by smoking cigarettes. Males were more likely than females to have used smokeless tobacco in the past month.

Types

Most smokeless tobacco use involves placing the product between the gum and the cheek or lip. Smokeless tobacco is a noncombustible tobacco product.

Types of smokeless tobacco include:
 Dipping tobacco, a type of tobacco that is placed between the lower or upper lip and gums
 Chewing tobacco, a type of tobacco that is chewed
 Iqmik, an Alaskan tobacco product which also contains punk ash
 Snuff, a type of tobacco that is inhaled or "snuffed" into the nasal cavity
 Snus, similar to dipping tobacco although the tobacco is placed under the upper lip and there is no need for spitting
 Creamy snuff, a fluid tobacco mixture marketed as a dental hygiene aid, albeit used for recreation
 Naswar, an Afghan tobacco product similar to dipping tobacco
 Tobacco gum, a kind of chewing gum containing tobacco
 Gutka, a mixture of  tobacco, areca nut, and various flavoring sold in South Asia
 Dissolvable tobacco, a variation on chewing tobacco that completely dissolves in the mouth
 Toombak and shammah, preparations found in North Africa, East Africa, and the Arabian peninsula
 Topical tobacco paste, a paste applied to the skin and absorbed through the dermis

Since there are varied manufacturing methods, products can differ greatly in chemical arrangement and nicotine level. Smokeless tobacco products typically contain over 3000 constituents which play a part in their taste as well as scent.

Nicotine levels

Smokeless tobacco differs depending on the type of product, the types of tobacco used, and the amount of each tobacco type used within a product. Each variable results in different level of nicotine. Furthermore, nicotine is absorbed by the body to different degrees depending on the pH level of the product, which is known as the free nicotine or unionized nicotine level.

Below are some measured nicotine levels of various smokeless tobacco products from 2006 and 2007 and their corresponding free nicotine levels as calculated by the Henderson–Hasselbalch equation.

Prevalence 

More than 300 million people are using smokeless tobacco worldwide. People of many regions, including India, Pakistan, other Asian countries, and North America, have a long history of smokeless tobacco use. Once addicted to nicotine from smokeless tobacco use, many people, particularly young people, expand their tobacco use by smoking cigarettes. Because young people who use smokeless tobacco can become addicted to nicotine, they may be more likely to also become cigarette smokers. Youth are particularly susceptible to starting smokeless tobacco use.

Males were more likely than females to have used smokeless tobacco in the past month. In 2014, 3.3 percent of people aged 12 or older (an estimated 8.7 million people) used smokeless tobacco in the past month. Past month smokeless tobacco use remained relatively stable between 2002 and 2014. Past month smokeless tobacco use between 2002 and 2014 was mostly consistent among adults aged 26 or older. There was more variability in the percentages of young adults aged 18 to 25 and adolescents aged 12 to 17 who used smokeless tobacco between 2002 and 2014. Smokeless tobacco use for adolescents aged 12 to 17 was higher during the mid-2000s, but the 2014 estimates were closer to the lower levels seen in the early 2000s. In 2014, an estimated 1.0 million people aged 12 or older used smokeless tobacco for the first time in the past year; this represents 0.5 percent of people who had not previously used smokeless tobacco.

In 2016 about 2 of every 100 middle school students in the US (2.2%) reported current use of smokeless tobacco. In 2016 nearly 6 of every 100 high school students in the US (5.8%) reported current use of smokeless tobacco.

Health effects

Positions of medical organizations 

, the World Health Organization states that "Smokeless tobacco use is a significant part of the overall world tobacco problem." , the American Cancer Society states that "Using any kind of spit or smokeless tobacco is a major health risk. It's less lethal than smoking tobacco, but less lethal is a far cry from safe." , the National Cancer Institute states that "because all tobacco products are harmful and cause cancer, the use of all of these products should be strongly discouraged. There is no safe level of tobacco use. People who use any type of tobacco product should be urged to quit". A panel of experts convened by the National Institutes of Health (NIH) in 2006 stated that the "range of risks, including nicotine addiction, from smokeless tobacco products may vary extensively because of differing levels of nicotine, carcinogens, and other toxins in different products". According to a 2002 report by the Royal College of Physicians, "As a way of using nicotine, the consumption of non-combustible tobacco is of the order of 10–1,000 times less hazardous than smoking, depending on the product". As long ago as 1986, the advisory committee to the Surgeon General concluded that the use of smokeless tobacco "is not a safe substitute for smoking cigarettes. It can cause cancer and a number of noncancerous oral conditions and can lead to nicotine addiction and dependence".

Smoking cessation 

Quitting smokeless tobacco use is as challenging as smoking cessation. There is no scientific evidence that using smokeless tobacco can help a person quit smoking.

Harm reduction 

, the World Health Organization states that "There is no evidence to recommend that any smokeless tobacco product should be used as part of a harm reduction strategy." Tobacco companies that sell smokeless tobacco products promote them as harm reduction products and a less harmful substitute to cigarettes.

Safety 

Smokeless tobacco products vary extensively worldwide in both form and health hazards, with some evidently toxic forms such as from South Asia, and some forms with less hazards such as snus from Sweden. It is correlated with a number of adverse effects such as dental disease, oral cancer, oesophagus cancer, and pancreatic cancer, cardiovascular disease, asthma, and deformities in the female reproductive system. A correlation was identified between smokeless tobacco and risk of fatal coronary artery disease and fatal stroke. Use of smokeless tobacco also seems to greatly raise the risk of non-fatal ischaemic heart disease among users in Asia, although not in Europe.

It is estimated the safety risk of smokeless tobacco is similar to that of electronic cigarettes, which has about 1% of the mortality risk of traditional cigarettes. Smokeless tobacco is not a healthy alternative to cigarette smoking. There is no safe level of smokeless tobacco use. The declines in smokeless tobacco initiation among adolescents and young adults is particularly relevant to improving the health of the nation because smokeless tobacco use is often linked to subsequent cigarette initiation. Smokeless tobacco users can experience these negative health consequences at any age. Smokeless tobacco accounts for an abundance of deaths globally with a significant proportion of them attributed to Southeast Asia. Youth use of tobacco in any form is unsafe.

Carcinogenicity 

All tobacco products contain toxicants, and smokeless tobacco products contain cancer-causing chemicals. The carcinogenic compounds occurring in smokeless tobacco vary widely, which rely upon the kind of product and how it was manufactured. A 2017 review found "Overall, 28 carcinogens have been rigorously identified across a range of major smokeless tobacco products, primarily from 3 groups of compounds: nonvolatile, alkaloid-derived TSNAs; N-nitrosoamino acids; and volatile N-nitrosamines. Among these carcinogens, researchers identify TSNAs as the most abundant in smokeless tobacco and the most carcinogenic." The amounts of nicotine in saliva from using smokeless tobacco could be at amounts that can cause cytotoxicity, according to in vitro studies.

Other chemicals found in tobacco can also cause cancer. These include: A radioactive element (polonium-210) found in tobacco fertilizer. Chemicals formed when tobacco is cured with heat (polynuclear aromatic hydrocarbons—also known as polycyclic aromatic hydrocarbons). Harmful metals (arsenic, beryllium, cadmium, chromium, cobalt, lead, nickel, mercury). Products such as 3-(methylnitrosamino)-proprionitrile, nitrosamines, and nicotine initiate the production of reactive oxygen species in smokeless tobacco, eventually leading to fibroblast, DNA, and RNA damage with carcinogenic effects in the mouth of tobacco consumers. The metabolic activation of nitrosamine in tobacco by cytochrome P450 enzymes may lead to the formation of N-nitrosonornicotine, a major carcinogen, and micronuclei, which are an indicator of genotoxicity. These effects lead to further DNA damage and, eventually, oral cancer. Smokeless tobacco can cause white or gray patches inside the mouth (leukoplakia) that can lead to cancer. The World Health Organization has classified smokeless tobacco products as human carcinogenic compounds, in particular tobacco-specific nitrosamines, which account for 76 to 91% of the total N-nitroso compound (NOC) burden. A 2014 review found there is "a number of ethnically linked smokeless tobacco types that contain areca nut, a Group 1 carcinogen. Use of areca nut-containing smokeless tobacco is known to cause oral cancer, yet despite this, prevalence is increasing in the Western Pacific." N-nitrosonornicotine and ketone are group 1 carcinogens to humans. These two nitrosamines found in smokeless tobacco products are the main agents for the majority of cancers in smokeless tobacco users.

Effects during pregnancy 

It is correlated with adverse reproductive effects including stillbirth, premature birth, low birth weight. Using smokeless tobacco during pregnancy can increase the risk for early delivery and stillbirth. Nicotine in smokeless tobacco products that are used during pregnancy can affect how a baby's brain develops before birth.

Management 

Due to smokeless tobacco harms, it should be treated. some medications shows some benefits are varenicline, nicotine lozenges. some behavioural interventions may help, however a cochrane review mentioned that there components need to be clearer.

History 

Smokeless tobacco was first discussed in the English language in 1683 as a powdered tobacco for breathing into the nose. People have used it for over a thousand years. Cigarette manufacturers have penetrated the smokeless tobacco market.

Public perceptions 

Many people who use smokeless tobacco may think it is safer than smoking, but all tobacco products contain toxicants, and use of smokeless tobacco poses its own significant health risks.  In South and South-East Asia these products are considered part of the cultural heritage and there is little enthusiasm for regulation. Around 80% of users live in these regions.

See also

 Herbal cigarette
 Herbal smokeless tobacco
 Tobacco
 Tobacco usage in sport
 Tobacco packaging warning messages#Smokeless tobacco

References 

Tobacco products
Carcinogens
IARC Group 1 carcinogens
Articles containing video clips